The Oga Peninsula (男鹿半島 Oga-hantō) is a rugged peninsula which projects west into the Sea of Japan from the coast of Akita in northern Honshū, the main island of Japan. Politically it coincides with the city of Oga.

At the base of the peninsula is Hachirōgata, formerly the second largest lake in Japan.

Oga Peninsula is famous for the traditional festival of Namahage.

Gallery

See also
Oga Aquarium Gao
Wakimoto Castle

Tourist attractions in Akita Prefecture
Peninsulas of Japan
Landforms of Akita Prefecture